The 2000–01 season was the 122nd season in Bolton Wanderers Football Club's existence, and their third successive season in the Football League First Division. It covers the period from 1 July 2000 to 30 June 2001.

Season summary
Bolton finished third, qualifying for the play-offs. Two late goals gave the Wanderers a 3–0 win over local rivals Preston North End, thus allowing Bolton return to the Premiership after an absence of three seasons.

Squad
Squad at end of season

Left club during season

Results

First Division

Play-offs

FA Cup

League Cup

Appearances
Bolton used a total of 35 players during the season.

Top scorers

References

 

2000-01
Bolton Wanderers